Cavaletti (also spelled cavalletti, singular (rarely used in English) cavaletto) (Italian: "little horse") are small jumps, originally made of wood, used for basic horse training. However, in informal terminology, even ground rails without standards are sometimes called "cavaletti." Modern designs can be made from various types of molded plastic and PVC pipe as well as wood. They can be used both for ground training with the handler working a horse on a longe line or at liberty, or while a rider is mounted on the horse. Cavaletti are used by practitioners of both English riding and western riding. Similar obstacles of lighter weight materials are used with dogs in dog agility and canine physical therapy.

Cavaletti were invented by Federico Caprilli and designed to help a horse improve its balance, adjust its length of stride, and to loosen and strengthen its muscles. They are  often used in sets of at least four to six placed in a row, but can be configured in nearly unlimited ways. By being set closer or farther apart than a horse's natural stride, they encourage lengthening or shortening of the stride. Used as a "gymnastic" in conjunction with other horse jumping obstacles in a training ring, they help teach the horse how to approach a fence at the proper speed and length of stride. Set at higher settings, they become small jumps to introduce young horses or beginning riders to jumping. 

In modern use, cavaletti are used not only for training, but also in some types of horse show  competition such as trail horse classes for western riders, and very basic beginning jumper classes. They are not only used as jumps or ground rails, but can also be used to define corridors for training exercises or in trail horse or driving classes.

There are potential safety issues associated with cavaletti.  The standards need to be designed to be a compromise that will be stable if lightly struck by a horse's leg or hoof, yet move or give way if tripped over or hit with force.  Standards need to be designed so that a horse cannot catch a leg in the "X" standard if they attempt to evade or run out on the cavaletti.  Cavaletti not designed to be stacked could fall in a dangerous manner if stacked and then knocked down.  Edges of standards should be squared or rounded in a manner to avoid presenting sharp edges if struck by a horse or a falling rider.

References

Horse training→